Fabio Piccolrovazzi, known as Fabio Rovazzi, (born 18 January 1994) is an Italian entertainer, who is most notable for his songs "Andiamo a comandare", "Tutto molto interessante" (both of which were certified platinum five times, and two times in Italy), and "Volare" (feat. Gianni Morandi). He studied at a school for producers.

Biography
Rovazzi was born in the Milanese district of Lambrate. As a child, he has cited having listened to Frank Zappa, Elio e le Storie Tese and The Who. Rovazzi joined the list of guests on the Italian entertainment show Quelli che... il Calcio on September 11, 2016.
On February 28, 2016, he published a video of a song he played on his social network platforms, "Andiamo a comandare" (English: "Let's go rule"), created in collaboration with Dabs of Two Fingerz; following the widespread popularity of the song, the single was released on streaming platforms by the label Newtopia (Universal Music Group) and was played by various Italian radio networks, which led to its becoming a summer hit.
The single entered the UK singles chart by June—reaching the top position on July 29, 2016—and was certified Platinum. In the same period, Rovazzi participated in several music festivals, including the fourth edition of the Coca-Cola Summer Festival. In 2016, Rovazzi appeared in the music video for Vorrei Ma Non Posto (English: I would like to, but I don’t post) by J-Ax and Fedez, and Che ne sanno i 2000 by Gabry Ponte. Since September 11, 2016, he has joined the ranks of guests on "Quelli che il calcio" on Rai 2, while on August 28th, he participated in the musical television show Bring the Noise.

On December 2nd of the same year, he released his second single, "Tutto molto interessante" (English: "Everything so fascinating"), which, on the same day, was accompanied by its music video.

On May 19, 2017, his third single "Volare" (English: Fly) was released with the participation of Gianni Morandi. 
In the summer of the same year, the company Big Babol published a piece of music for the commercial "Solo se ci sei te" (English: "Only if you are there") starring Rovazzi.

In 2018, he starred as the protagonist of the film Il vegetale, directed by Gennaro Nunziante.

On 13 July 2018, his fourth single, "Faccio quello che voglio" (English: "I do what I want") was released in collaboration with Emma Marrone.

In the summer of 2019, an additional song called "Senza pensieri" (English: "Thoughtless") was released, which featured Rovazzi alongside two other italian singers: J-Ax and Loredana Berte. During the Gemini Man premiere and party hosted by Will Smith in Budapest, Rovazzi met Smith in a hotel room; a video of the two alongside one another was published on YouTube and went viral. Then, in 2020, when Fabio and his wife were in Hollywood, Fabio went to the movie studio for Robert Downey Jr.'s Dolittle for the Italian press, where he then met Downey Jr.

Voice actor
Ralph Breaks the Internet (2018)
Stormtrooper (Star Wars)
Call of Duty: Modern Warfare - Morte (2019)

Coca-Cola Summer Festival 2016
Fabio Rovazzi took second place at Summer Festival 2016 with the song "Andiamo a Comandare".

Wind Summer Festival 2017
Fabio Rovazzi took fourth place at Summer Festival 2017 with the song "Tutto molto interessante".

Wind Music Award 2017
Fabio Rovazzi won the competition with the song "Volare" feat. Gianni Morandi, and, at the same time, he took third place with the song "Tutto molto interessante".

Wind Summer Festival 2018
Fabio Rovazzi won the competition with the song "Faccio Quello che Voglio" feat. Emma Marrone, Nek and Al Bano.

Discography

Singles

Filmography

References

External links

 Fabio Rovazzi at Allmusic
 Fabio Rovazzi at Musicbrainz

1994 births
Living people
Italian rappers
Singers from Milan
21st-century Italian  male singers